Andrea Gervasoni (born 21 July 1975) is an Italian professional football referee who officiates primarily in the Serie A.

References

External links 
 
 
 

1975 births
Living people
Italian football referees